Luís Carlos Coelho Winck, (born 5 January 1963) is a Brazilian football coach and former player who played as a right back. He is the current head coach of Anápolis.

Club career
Luís Carlos Winck his successful career in football as a defensive midfielder with Internacional, moving to the right-back position in 1984 under late coach, Ênio Andrade. Having changed his position, Winck quickly improved his performance, winning the most important award in Brazil run by sports magazine Placar (Bola de Prata) as the best player in his position that year (he would conquer the prize again in 1987).

In 1996, he retired while playing in São José-RS. Then he became coach, for teams such as São José itself, Grêmio Coariense, São Raimundo-AM and Sampaio Correa. He is currently with River Atlético Clube.

International career
Luís Carlos Winck, along with midfielder Ademir Kaefer, is the only Brazilian soccer player to get two silver medals in the Olympic Games (1984 and 1988). As well as his involvement at the Olympics, Luís Carlos Winck also appeared for the Brazilian senior national team on 19 occasions, between April 1985 to June 1993, but was never called up to a World Cup. He was selected for the Copa América in 1993. He scored twice for his country, once against Mexico in 1988, and once against the United States in 1993.

Honours

Player
Internacional
 Campeonato Gaúcho (4): 1981, 1982, 1984, 1991

Vasco da Gama
 Campeonato Brasileiro (1): 1989

Grêmio
 Campeonato Gaúcho (1): 1993

Brazil
 Olympic Silver Medal: 1984, 1988

References

1963 births
Sportspeople from Rio Grande do Sul
Living people
Brazilian footballers
Brazilian football managers
Footballers at the 1984 Summer Olympics
Footballers at the 1988 Summer Olympics
Medalists at the 1988 Summer Olympics
Medalists at the 1984 Summer Olympics
Olympic footballers of Brazil
Olympic silver medalists for Brazil
1993 Copa América players
Brazil international footballers
Brazilian people of German descent
Olympic medalists in football
Association football forwards
Campeonato Brasileiro Série A players
Campeonato Brasileiro Série B managers
Sport Club Internacional players
CR Vasco da Gama players
Grêmio Foot-Ball Porto Alegrense players
Sport Club Corinthians Paulista players
Clube Atlético Mineiro players
Botafogo de Futebol e Regatas players
CR Flamengo footballers
Esporte Clube São José players
Sampaio Corrêa Futebol Clube managers
Ríver Atlético Clube managers
São Raimundo Esporte Clube managers
Clube 15 de Novembro managers
Cianorte Futebol Clube managers
Esporte Clube São José managers
Esporte Clube Internacional managers
Nacional Futebol Clube managers
Clube Esportivo Bento Gonçalves managers
Clube Esportivo Lajeadense managers
Esporte Clube Pelotas managers
Sociedade Esportiva e Recreativa Caxias do Sul managers
Criciúma Esporte Clube managers
Esporte Clube Juventude managers
Anápolis Futebol Clube managers
Grêmio Esportivo Glória managers